Simon Jack (born 10 May 1971) is an English business journalist and news correspondent. He is currently the Business Editor for BBC News, known for appearing on BBC Breakfast until September 2011 and on BBC Radio 4's Today. He has also presented business and financial podcasts for The Daily Telegraph.

Education
Simon Jack was born on 10 May 1971 in London. He attended Merchant Taylors' Boys' School, Crosby, Merseyside, and graduated from St John's College, Oxford with a BA in Philosophy, Politics and Economics. Of his time at Oxford, Jack said: “I did the same degree as David Cameron. I was a contemporary of George Osborne. I knew him a little bit. He was well-known at university and his notoriety of his membership of certain clubs is well known – like the Bullingdon. I wasn't a member of any of those."

Career
Before entering journalism, Jack worked for a decade as a corporate and investment banker in London, New York City and Bermuda. He has said that he neither liked the work, nor showed much ability at it. In 2003 he joined the BBC's business and economics unit and since then has worked on BBC Radio 4's Today Programme and Radio 5 Live's Wake Up to Money. He has also presented business and financial podcasts for The Daily Telegraph.

Jack was frequently seen on British television during the fortnight beginning on 7 September 2008 during which he reported for BBC News, the BBC News Channel and Working Lunch on the banking crisis that saw the Federal takeover of Fannie Mae and Freddie Mac, the Bankruptcy of Lehman Brothers, the bailout of AIG and the Lloyds TSB takeover of HBOS. He was often seen reporting from the London Stock Exchange, Canary Wharf and outside the offices of HBOS and Lehman Brothers in London.

Jack replaced Declan Curry as business presenter for BBC Breakfast in October 2008. In April 2010, he presented BBC Breakfast alongside Sian Williams while regular presenter Bill Turnbull followed the 2010 general election campaign trail. In September 2011, he left the BBC Breakfast team to join BBC Radio 4's Today.

On 13 April 2015 Jack, whose father killed himself, appeared in a BBC Panorama series relating to the survivors of suicide which investigated why more middle-aged men kill themselves than any other group.

On 5 February 2016, Jack was appointed the BBC's Business Editor, replacing the promoted Kamal Ahmed.

Personal life
Jack lives in Notting Hill and is married to Suzy Barry, and is a son-in-law of the composer John Barry.

References

Living people
Alumni of St John's College, Oxford
British television presenters
BBC newsreaders and journalists
British business and financial journalists
People educated at Merchant Taylors' Boys' School, Crosby
1971 births